Durag in Iran may refer to:
 Durag-e Atabak, Fars Province
 Durag-e Cheshmeh Konari, Fars Province
 Durag-e Madineh, Fars Province